2000 series may refer to:

Japanese train types
 Aichi Loop Railway 2000 series electric multiple unit
 Chichibu Railway 2000 series electric multiple unit
 Chikuho Electric Railroad 2000 series electric multiple unit operated on the Chikuhō Electric Railroad Line
 Choshi Electric Railway 2000 series electric multiple unit
 Fujikyu 2000 series electric multiple unit
 Fukuoka Subway 2000 series electric multiple unit
 JR Shikoku 2000 series diesel multiple unit
 Keikyu 2000 series electric multiple unit
 Kobe New Transit 2000 series electric multiple unit
 Meitetsu 2000 series electric multiple unit
 Nagano Electric Railway 2000 series electric multiple unit
 Nagoya Municipal Subway 2000 series electric multiple unit
 Odakyu 2000 series electric multiple unit
 Osaka Monorail 2000 series electric multiple unit
 Saitama Rapid Railway 2000 series electric multiple unit
 Sendai Subway 2000 series electric multiple unit
 Tokyo Monorail 2000 series electric multiple unit
 Tokyo Metro 2000 series electric multiple unit
 Tokyu 2000 series electric multiple unit
 Tōyō Rapid 2000 series electric multiple unit
 TX-2000 series electric multiple unit

Other
 2000 series (Chicago 'L')
 2000 class railcar (Adelaide Metro)
 Radeon HD 2000 series graphics processing units developed by ATI
 SPV-2000 (Budd Company)